The 2006 Wheelchair Tennis Masters was held in the Frans Otten Stadion in Amsterdam, Netherlands between November 14 and November 19, 2006.

Men's singles

Contenders

Group stage

Group A

Group B

7th/8th place match

5th/6th place match

Semifinals

3rd/4th place match

Final

Men's quads

Contenders

Group stage

3rd/4th place match

Final

Women's singles

Contenders

Group stage

Group A

Group B

7th/8th place match

5th/6th place match

Semifinals

3rd/4th place match

Final

Wheelchair Tennis Masters
Wheelchair Tennis Masters
W
Masters, 2006